This is a list of National Basketball Association players whose last names begin with G.

The list also includes players from the American National Basketball League (NBL), the Basketball Association of America (BAA), and the original American Basketball Association (ABA). All of these leagues contributed to the formation of the present-day NBA.

Individuals who played in the NBL prior to its 1949 merger with the BAA are listed in italics, as they are not traditionally listed in the NBA's official player registers.

G

Billy Gabor
Wenyen Gabriel
Dan Gadzuric
Daniel Gafford
Deng Gai
Elmer Gainer
Bill Gaines
Corey Gaines
David Gaines
Reece Gaines
Sundiata Gaines
Laddie Gale
Mike Gale
Chad Gallagher
Harry Gallatin
Danilo Gallinari
Langston Galloway
Lowell Galloway
Dave Gambee
Kevin Gamble
Fred Gantt
Bob Gantt
Jorge Garbajosa
Rubén Garcés
Alex Garcia
Francisco García
Frank Garcia
Ben Gardner
Chuck Gardner
Earl Gardner
Ken Gardner
Thomas Gardner
Vern Gardner
Jack Garfinkel
Patricio Garino
Darius Garland
Gary Garland
Winston Garland
Dick Garmaker
Bill Garner
Chris Garner
Bill Garnett
Kevin Garnett
Marlon Garnett
Billy Garrett Jr.
Calvin Garrett
Dean Garrett
Diante Garrett
Dick Garrett
Marcus Garrett
Rowland Garrett
Tom Garrick
John Garris
Kiwane Garris
Pat Garrity
Usman Garuba
James Garvin
Luka Garza
Marc Gasol
Pau Gasol
Frank Gates
Pop Gates
Chris Gatling
Kenny Gattison
Bob Gauchat
Rudy Gay
Ed Gayda
Andrew Gaze
Michael Gbinije
Reggie Geary
Alonzo Gee
Johnny Gee
Matt Geiger
Mickaël Gelabale
Hal Gensichen
Devean George
Jack George
Paul George
Tate George
Marcus Georges-Hunt
Gus Gerard
Bob Gerber
Derrick Gervin
George Gervin
Gorham Getchell
John Gianelli
Dick Gibbs
Jim Gibbs
John Gibbs
Daniel Gibson
Dee Gibson
Hoot Gibson
Jonathan Gibson
Mel Gibson
Mike Gibson
Taj Gibson
J. R. Giddens
Josh Giddey
Boody Gilbertson
Trey Gilder
Harry Giles
Shai Gilgeous-Alexander
Frankie Gilhooley
Anthony Gill
Eddie Gill
Kendall Gill
Ben Gillery
Freddie Gillespie
Jack Gillespie
Gene Gillette
Armen Gilliam
Herm Gilliam
Artis Gilmore
Walt Gilmore
Chuck Gilmur
Manu Ginóbili
Hymie Ginsburg
Gordan Giriček
Jack Givens
Mickell Gladness
George Glamack
Ed Glancy
Gerald Glass
Jim Glass
Mike Glenn
Normie Glick
Georgi Glouchkov
Clarence Glover
Dion Glover
Andreas Glyniadakis
Mike Gminski
Rudy Gobert
Dan Godfread
Pim Goff
Tom Gola
Ben Goldfaden
Jackie Goldsmith
Anthony Goldwire
Ryan Gomes
Glen Gondrezick
Grant Gondrezick
Drew Gooden
Gail Goodrich
Steve Goodrich
Archie Goodwin
Brandon Goodwin
Jordan Goodwin
Pop Goodwin
Aaron Gordon
Ben Gordon
Drew Gordon
Eric Gordon
Lancaster Gordon
Paul Gordon
Marcin Gortat
Leo Gottlieb
Andrew Goudelock
Gerald Govan
Bato Govedarica
Joe Graboski
Ricky Grace
Erwin Graf
Fred Grafft
Cal Graham
Devonte' Graham
Greg Graham
Joey Graham
Mal Graham
Orlando Graham
Otto Graham
Paul Graham
Stephen Graham
Treveon Graham
Jim Grandholm
Ronnie Grandison
Danny Granger
Stewart Granger
Brian Grant
Bud Grant
Gary Grant
Greg Grant
Harvey Grant
Horace Grant
Jerami Grant
Jerian Grant
Josh Grant
Paul Grant
Travis Grant
Donte Grantham
Don Grate
Walter Grauman
Butch Graves
Hassani Gravett
Aaron Gray
Cortez Gray
Devin Gray
Ed Gray
Evric Gray
Gary Gray
Josh Gray
Leonard Gray
Stuart Gray
Sylvester Gray
Wyndol Gray
Jeff Grayer
Bob Greacen
A. C. Green
A. J. Green
Danny Green
Devin Green
Draymond Green
Erick Green
Gerald Green
Jalen Green
JaMychal Green
Javonte Green
Jeff Green
Johnny Green
Josh Green
Ken Green
Kenny Green
Lamar Green
Litterial Green
Luther Green
Mike Green
Rickey Green
Sean Green
Sidney Green
Sihugo Green
Steve Green
Taurean Green
Tommie Green
Willie Green
Donté Greene
Orien Greene
Jerry Greenspan
David Greenwood
Hal Greer
Lynn Greer
Gary Gregor
Claude Gregory
John Greig
Norm Grekin
Al Grenert
Kevin Grevey
Dennis Grey
AJ Griffin
Adrian Griffin
Blake Griffin
Eddie Griffin
Greg Griffin
Paul Griffin
Taylor Griffin
Darrell Griffith
Ken Griffith
Chuck Grigsby
Quentin Grimes
Derek Grimm
George Grimshaw
Dick Groat
Bob Gross
Mike Grosso
Art Grove
Alex Groza
Dick Grubar
Anthony Grundy
Ace Gruenig
Ernie Grunfeld
Nick Grunzweig
Gene Guarilia
Marko Gudurić
Pétur Guðmundsson
Richie Guerin
Tom Gugliotta
Andres Guibert
Jay Guidinger
Ken Gunning
Coulby Gunther
Dave Gunther
Al Guokas
Matt Guokas Sr.
Matt Guokas
Jorge Gutiérrez
Kyle Guy
A. J. Guyton

References
  NBA & ABA Players with Last Names Starting with G @ basketball-reference.com
 NBL Players with Last Names Starting with G @ basketball-reference.com

G